Three ships of the Royal Navy have borne the name HMS Nereus, after the Greek deity Nereus:

 , a 32-gun frigate that served between 1809 and 1817
 , a 46-gun modified  that was never commissioned and served as a store ship until 1879
 , an  launched in 1916 and sold for breaking up in 1921

See also
 Nereus (disambiguation)

References

Royal Navy ship names